Cannae (pronounced KA-nigh) is an American metalcore band from Boston, Massachusetts. Their style mixes death metal, hardcore and thrash metal, with a focus on dual guitar work (guitarist Alex Vieira was formerly with Capharnaum), heavy, double bass drumming and both growling and screaming vocals. They are currently signed to Prosthetic Records.

Members

Current members 
Adam DuLong – vocals
Stephen Colombo – guitar
Shane Frisby – bass
Alex Vieira – guitar

Former members 
Colin Conway – drums
Jason Zucco– guitar
Daniel Campenella – bass
Michael Boutillette – drums

Discography 
Demo (1999)
Troubleshooting Death (2000) – Eastcoast Empire, re-released on Brutal Records
Horror (2003) – Prosthetic Records
Gold Becomes Sacrifice (2005) – Prosthetic Records

References

External links 
Cannae at Prosthetic Records
Cannae at MySpace
Cannae at PureVolume

Musical groups from Boston
Heavy metal musical groups from Massachusetts
Metalcore musical groups from Massachusetts
Musical quintets
Musical groups established in 2000